Hendrik Rijnders (6 May 1904 – 8 February 1979), best known as Henk but also Henry, was a Dutch rower. He competed in the men's eight event at the 1924 Summer Olympics.

References

External links
 

1904 births
1979 deaths
Dutch male rowers
Olympic rowers of the Netherlands
Rowers at the 1924 Summer Olympics
People from Semarang Regency